Chris Rock: Kill the Messenger is a television special that premiered on HBO on September 27, 2008 starring comedian Chris Rock. This is Chris Rock's fifth comedy special and the final one for HBO. It was edited together from three performances: one at the Carnival City Casino in Johannesburg, one at the HMV Hammersmith Apollo in London and one at the Apollo Theater in New York City.

Reception
Kill the Messenger won two Emmy Awards, including one for Outstanding Writing for a Variety, Music or Comedy Special.

References

External links 
 

2008 television specials
2000s American television specials
HBO network specials
Kill The Messenger
Television shows directed by Marty Callner